Kanal D Romania (short form of Kanal Doğan) is a nationwide television channel in Romania and a part of Doğan Holding, which is owned by the Turkish media tycoon Aydın Doğan. The channel was launched on 18 February 2007 and its birthday is on 1 March every year.

In 2012, Kanal D Romania was ranked in the top three channels in Romania. Kanal D Romania is also being in the first place with many of its television programs in prime-time, such as Turkish television series and Turkish soap operas.

In 2016, in Prime Time (20:00 - 24:00), Kanal D ranked second in the top TV channels in Romania, both in the All Urban target (an increase from 2015 of +21%) and National (an increase from 2015 of +26%).

References

External links
 
Kanal D Romania at LyngSat Address

Television stations in Romania
Television channels and stations established in 2007
Doğan Media Group